2021 in arthropod palentology is a list of new arthropod fossil taxa, including arachnids, crustaceans, insects, trilobites, and other arthropods that were announced or described, as well as other significant arthropod paleontological discoveries and events which occurred in 2021.

Arachnids

New taxa

Research 
 Revision of the fossil record of whip spiders is published by Haug & Haug (2021).
 Guo, Selden & Ren (2021) describe an adult lagonomegopid female, part of an egg sac and lagonomegopid spiderlings preserved in four pieces of Burmese amber, and interpret this finding as evidence of maternal care in fossil spiders.
 An exuvium of a member of the genus Myrmecarchaea is described from the Eocene Cambay amber (India) by Wood, Singh & Grimaldi (2021), representing the first member of the family Archaeidae from Cambay amber reported to date.
An indeterminate deutonymph belonging to the family Sejidae is described by Joharchi, Vorontsov and Walter (2021) from Burmese amber, which represents the oldest record of the parasitiform mite clade Mesostigmata.

Crustaceans

New taxa

Malacostracans

Ostracods

Other crustaceans

Research
 A study on the anatomy and phylogenetic relationships of the species "Penaeus" natator from the Santonian of Lebanon is published by Audo, Winkler & Charbonnier (2021), who interpret this species as a relative of Pseudodrobna kenngotti from the Late Jurassic of Germany, and transfer it to the genus Pseudodrobna
 A study on the anatomy and morphological variation in Beurlenia araripensis, based on data from fossil samples from the Crato Formation (Brazil), is published by Barros et al. (2021).
 A study on the anatomy of the eyes of Callichimaera perplexa, and on their growth during the ontogeny of this crab, is published by Jenkins, Briggs & Luque (2021).
 A study on the anatomy and phylogenetic relationships of Oxyuropoda is published by Robin et al. (2021), who interpret this arthropod as the oldest known member of the crown group of Peracarida.
 Fossil evidence of early colonization of estuarine settings by ostracods is reported from the Silurian Si Ka Formation (Vietnam) by McGairy et al. (2021)
 A study on evolutionary trends in sexual dimorphism of cytheroid ostracods from the Gulf and Atlantic coastal plain from the Late Cretaceous to the late Eocene is published by Matzke-Karasz & Smith (2021).

Insects

Radiodonts

New taxa

Research
 A study on the morphologies of frontal appendages and probable modes of feeding of radiodonts from the Burgess Shale is published by De Vivo, Lautenschlager & Vinther (2021).

Trilobites

New taxa

Research
 A study on middle–late Cambrian trilobite diversity patterns in South China is published by Zhang et al. (2021).
 Sun, Zeng & Zhao (2021) describe digestive structures of representatives of five trilobite genera from the Cambrian Mantou Formation and Zhangxia Formation (Liaoning, China).
 Hou, Hughes & Hopkins (2021) report structural details of the upper limb branch of Triarthrus eatoni and Olenoides serratus, and interpret their findings as indicating that the upper limb branch of trilobites served a respiratory function.
 A study on the morphology of Redlichia rex and Olenoides serratus, aiming to determine whether these trilobites were adapted for durophagy, is published by Bicknell et al. (2021).
 A study exploring the existence and the nature of growth gradients along the main body axis of Oryctocarella duyunensis is published by Dai et al (2021), who interpret O. duyunensis as the first trilobite with documented determinate growth.
 Description of all meraspid stages of Oryctocarella duyunensis, based on data from specimens from the Cambrian Balang Formation (Hunan, South China), is published by Dai et al. (2021).
 A study on the ontogenic moulting sequence of Arthricocephalites xinzhaiheensis, based on data from specimens from the Balang Formation, is published by Wang et al. (2021).
 A study on post-embryonic axial growth in Estaingia bilobata is published by Holmes, Paterson & García-Bellido (2021).
 A study on the functional performance of Placoparia cambriensis in water is published by Esteve et al. (2021), who interpret their findings as indicating that this trilobite was not able to swim, but it was capable of hopping locomotion, and it might represent a transitional form between benthic animals without swimming skills and animals able to swim near the benthos.
 A study on the phylogenetic relationships within Harpetida, and on the impact of the Ordovician–Silurian extinction events on this group, is published by Beech & Lamsdell (2021).
 The first known Silurian trilobite specimen preserved with soft parts reported to date (a specimen of Dalmanites preserved with appendages and alimentary system) is described from the Herefordshire Lagerstätte (United Kingdom) by Siveter et al. (2021).
 A study on the long-term evolutionary history of Devonian trilobites in North Africa is published by Bault et al. (2021).
 A study on the hydrodynamics of queuing behaviour in Trimerocephalus chopini is published by Song et al. (2021).
 Evidence from trace and body fossils indicative of the presence of trilobites in brackish-water settings is presented by Mángano et al. (2021).
 A study on the chemical changes in the exoskeleton of trilobites induced by diagenesis, based on data from pygidia of Athabaskia anax from the Miaolingian of San Isidro (Argentina), is published by D'Angelo et al. (2021), is published by D'Angelo et al. (2021), who argue that some morphological characteristics of the trilobite pygidia are in fact results of chemical and structural changes taking place during fossilization, and evaluate possible systematic implications of the chemical data, advising caution when using morphological characteristics of the exoskeletons to establish new taxa.
 The study on the internal structures of eyes of trilobites belonging to the genera Asaphus and Archegonus published by Scholtz, Staude & Dunlop (2019) is criticized by Schoenemann & Clarkson (2021).
 A study on the biomechanics of the trilobite cephalon is published by Esteve et al. (2021), who interpret their findings as indicating that in the sutured trilobites the cephalon was able to withstand greater stresses than in their non‐sutured counterparts, and argue that the ability to withstand greater burrowing loads enabled trilobites to successfully invade bioturbated and more consolidated sediments during the Cambrian substrate revolution.
 A study on the compound eyes of trilobites belonging to the group Phacopina is published by Schoenemann et al. (2021), who interpret their findings as indicating that these trilobites had hyper-compound eyes hiding an individual compound eye below each of the big lenses, resulting in each of the compound eyes comprising tens or hundreds of small compound eye systems.
A study on the systematics of Devonian trochurine trilobites is published by Van Viersen (2021).

Other arthropods

New taxa

Research
 Lan et al. (2021) report exquisite preservation of bilaterally symmetric brain in leanchoiliid specimens from the Cambrian Kaili biota (China), and evaluate the implications of these fossils for the knowledge of the evolution of the central nervous system in arthropods.
 A study on carapace shape variation and hydrodynamic performance of members of the genus Isoxys is published by Pates et al. (2021), who argue that members of this genus occupied a variety of distinct niches in Cambrian oceans, and some were adapted for vertical movement in the water column.
 A study on the composition and microstructure of the carapace of Chuandianella ovata is published by Liu, Fu & Zhang (2021), who interpret their findings as indicating that this arthropod reinforced its carapace with phosphatic mineralization.
 A study on the post-embryonic development of Chuandianella ovata is published by Liu, Fu & Zhang (2021).
 Braddy & Dunlop (2021) argue that Parioscorpio venator was a cheloniellid-like arthropod with large raptorial appendages.
 New information on the anatomy of the head of Fuxianhuia is presented by Aria, Zhao & Zhu (2021), who interpret fuxianhuiids as mandibulates.
 Partial remains of a member of the genus Arthropleura, representing one of the largest arthropod fossils reported to date and providing new information on the exoskeleton of Arthropleura, are described from the Carboniferous (Serpukhovian) Stainmore Formation (Northumberland, England, United Kingdom) by Davies et al. (2021), who also evaluate the implications of this finding for the knowledge of arthropleurid habitat and factors that enabled the evolution of large body size in arthropleurids.
 Revision of the morphological diversity, relationships and taxonomy of Early Triassic thylacocephalans is published by Laville et al. (2021).
 Description of new fossil material of Mayrocaris bucculata from the Solnhofen Limestone, providing new information on the anatomy of this thylacocephalan, is published by Laville et al. (2021), who evaluate the implications of these fossils for the knowledge of the body organization and phylogenetic affinities of thylacocephalans.
 A study on the morphology and possible intraspecific variability of Sinoburius lunaris is published by Schmidt et al. (2021).
 A fossil larva lacking segmentation of the carapace, closely resembling the trilobite protaspis, is described from the Ordovician (Darriwilian) of central Siberia by Dzik (2021), found associated with other skeletal elements of the angarocaridid Girardevia; however, Lerosey-Aubril & Laibl (2021) subsequently interpret this specimen as actually belonging to the trilobite genus Isotelus or a related taxon, and conclude that protaspid larvae represent a developmental trait unique to trilobites.
 A study on the possible relationships between eurypterid morphology, the ease with which members of this group experienced ecdysis, and longevity of eurypterid species is published by Brandt (2021).
 A geometric morphometric analysis of data from eurypterine eurypterid specimens is presented by Bicknell & Amati (2021).
 Redescription of Leiopterella tetliei is published by Braddy, Dunlop & Bonsor (2021).
 Bicknell, Melzer & Schmidt (2021) reconstruct prosomal appendages of Eurypterus tetragonophthalmus and Pentecopterus decorahensis, model the flexure and extension of these appendages.
 A study on the range of motion of prosomal appendages in Megalograptus ohioensis and Mixopterus kiaeri, and on its implications for the knowledge of the likely foraging strategies of these eurypterids, is published by Schmidt et al. (2021).
 Bicknell et al. (2021) report the discovery of exceptionally preserved central nervous system in a specimen of Euproops danae from the Carboniferous Mazon Creek fossil beds (Illinois, United States).
 A specimen of Euproops danae preserving anatomical details of the prosomal musculature is described from the Carboniferous Lawrence Formation (Kansas, United States) by Bicknell et al. (2021).
 Redescription and a study on the phylogenetic relationships of Prolimulus woodwardi is published by Lustri, Laibl & Bicknell (2021).
 Revision of Sloveniolimulus rudkini, based on data from new fossil material from the Anisian Strelovec Formation (Slovenia), is published by Bicknell et al. (2021).
 A study on the anatomy and phylogenetic relationships of Parioscorpio venator is published by Anderson et al. (2021).

General research
 A study on the evolution of the arthropod labrum is published by Budd (2021), who reevaluates the morphology of the Cambrian stem-euarthropod Parapeytoia and evaluates its implications for the knowledge of the origin of the labrum.
 Liu et al. (2021) report the discovery a previously undetected exite at the base of most appendages of Leanchoilia illecebrosa, as well as morphologically similar (and likely homologous) exite in the same position in Naraoia spinosa and Retifacies abnormalis, and evaluate the implications of this discovery for the knowledge of the origin of exites in arthropod phylogeny.

References

2021 in paleontology
Arthropod paleontology